The Place de la Bataille-de-Stalingrad is a square in the 19th arrondissement of Paris. It was named after the Battle of Stalingrad, one of the major battles of World War II. The square lies at the intersection of the Canal de l'Ourcq and the Canal Saint-Martin.

History 
Formerly a part of the Boulevard de la Villette, a square named "Place de Stalingrad" was created in 1945 and served as a bus terminal. In 1993 it was renamed  "Place de la Bataille-de-Stalingrad" and in 2006, in the course of major renovation work around the Bassin de la Villette, was completely renovated. Today, it is a pedestrian square and houses two restaurants and a central fountain.

Bataille-de-Stalingrad
Buildings and structures in the 19th arrondissement of Paris
Buildings and structures in the 10th arrondissement of Paris